Moebjergarctus manganis is a species of tardigrades. It is in the genus Moebjergarctus, part of the family Halechiniscidae. The species has been found in the southeastern part of the Pacific Ocean. They were first named and described by Christian Bussau in 1992.

References

Further reading
Bussau, 1992: "New deep-sea Tardigrada (Arthrotardigrada, Halechiniscidae) from a manganese nodule area of the eastern South Pacific". Zoologica Scripta, vol. 21, no. 1, p. 79-91.

Halechiniscidae
Fauna of the Pacific Ocean
Animals described in 1992